Nir Baram (Hebrew: ניר ברעם; born June 2, 1976 in Jerusalem) is an Israeli author. Baram studied literature in Tel Aviv University and was an editor in Am Oved publishing house. His novels, The Remaker of Dreams (2006), Good People (2010) and At Night's End (2018), were short listed for Israel's Sapir Prize for Literature and were Best sellers in Israel. Good people was translated into 10 languages and in 2010 Baram won the Prime Minister's Award for Hebrew literature and was shortlisted for the Rome Prize for literature (Premio Roma). His novel World Shadow, published in 2013, was a bestseller and attracted many responses inside the literary world and outside of it. Baram writes for Haaretz and other newspapers and is known for his political opinions. In the summer of 2006 he was one of the leaders of the young poets and authors who called for the ceasefire in the 2006 Lebanon War and in 2010 he gave a political and controversial speech in the opening of the 2nd International Writers Festival in Jerusalem.

In 2016 he published the non-fiction book A Land without Borders, based on his 2 years journey in the West Bank, which Baram later made into a documentary that won the Ophir Award (the Israeli Oscar) for best documentary in 2018. In 2018 Baram also published his novel At Night's End, based  also on his childhood experiences in Jerusalem. The novel was a bestseller in Israel and was shortlisted for the Sapir prize for literature.

His father and grandfather are the Israeli politicians Uzi and Moshe Baram.

Books 
 The Remaker of Dreams, Keter, 2006 (German: Der Wiederträumer,Schöffling, 2009) 
 Good people, Am Oved, 2010 (German- Carl Hanser Verlag; Spain- Alfaguara; Brasil- Editora Objetiva; France- Éditions Robert Laffont; Netherlands- De Bezige Bij; Italy- Ponte alle Grazie; Norway- Gyldendal; Finland- Otava; Denmark- Gyldendal; Catalan- Empuries Narrativa), (English- Text publishing
 World Shadow, Am Oved, 2013  Spain- Alfaguara, Netherlands- De Bezige Bij, Belgium- De Bezige Bij, Mexico- Alfaguara, Germany and Austria- Carl Hanser, Text publishing - world English rights
 At Night's End, Am Oved, 2018, World rights were sold to Text publishing house

External links 
 Author's blog
 Delusion-chronicle, Review in the Economist on Good People
 Nir Baram interview in Haaretz English edition about his new novel 'At Night's End' 
 Acclaimed Israeli author Nir Baram settles the score with globalization and the Israeli left
 The Israeli left's last novel
 Lorin Stein, editor of The Paris Review, and Nir Baram compare notes
 Israeli writers' festival to prescreen speeches in bid to ban political content
 from The New York Times about the 2010 Festival in Jerusalem
 "The pen – mightier than the sword?"
 Nir Baram talks in the 43 years of occupation – Protest – Tel Aviv
 "Dream on" Interview in Haaretz after the publication of the "Remaker of Dreams"
 A review in Haaretz about "World Shadow
 The Israeli left's zombie argument
 Nir Baram at the International Literature Festival Berlin 2016

1976 births
Living people
Israeli journalists
Israeli novelists
People from Jerusalem
Tel Aviv University alumni
Recipients of Prime Minister's Prize for Hebrew Literary Works